Milan Đurišić, (born 11 April 1987 in Titograd, SR Montenegro, Yugoslavia), is a Montenegrin footballer who plays as a right back for Iskra Danilovgrad.

References

External links

1987 births
Living people
Footballers from Podgorica
Association football midfielders
Serbia and Montenegro footballers
Montenegrin footballers
Montenegro under-21 international footballers
FK Budućnost Podgorica players
OFK Titograd players
FK Kom players
HNK Rijeka players
FK Lovćen players
FK Mogren players
FK Iskra Danilovgrad players
First League of Serbia and Montenegro players
Montenegrin First League players
Croatian Football League players
Montenegrin expatriate footballers
Expatriate footballers in Croatia
Montenegrin expatriate sportspeople in Croatia